XXII Mountain Corps was a mountain corps of the German Army during World War II that fought in Greece, Yugoslavia and Hungary between 1943 and 1945. 

Until September 1944, it was subordinate to Army Group E and after that to the 2nd Panzer Army.

Commanders 
 General der Gebirgstruppe Hubert Lanz (12 August 1943 - 8 May 1945)

Source
Lexikon der Wehrmacht

M22
Military units and formations established in 1943
Military units and formations disestablished in 1945
Epirus in World War II
German occupation of Greece during World War II